The 1989 Giro d'Italia was the 72nd edition of the Giro d'Italia, one of cycling's Grand Tours. The Giro began in Taormina, with a flat stage on 21 May, and Stage 13 occurred on 2 June with a stage from Padua. The race finished in Florence on 11 June.

Stage 13
2 June 1989 — Padua to Tre Cime di Lavaredo,

Stage 14
3 June 1989 — Misurina to Corvara,

Stage 15a
4 June 1989 — Corvara to Trento,

Stage 15b
4 June 1989 — Trento to Trento,

Stage 16
5 June 1989 — Trento to Santa Caterina di Valfurva

The stage was cancelled due to bad weather.

Stage 17
6 June 1989 — Sondrio to Meda,

Stage 18
7 June 1989 — Mendrisio to Monte Generoso,  (ITT)

Stage 19
8 June 1989 — Meda to Tortona,

Stage 20
9 June 1989 — Voghera to La Spezia,

Stage 21
10 June 1989 — La Spezia to Prato,

Stage 22
11 June 1989 — Prato to Florence,  (ITT)

References

1989 Giro d'Italia
Giro d'Italia stages